10th of Ramadan is a city located in the Sharqia Governorate, Egypt. It is a first-generation new urban community, and one of the most industrialized. It enjoys close proximity to the city of Cairo, and is considered part of Greater Cairo. It was founded by Presidential Decree No. 249 in 1977 in a bid to attract foreign and local capital with the intent of providing job opportunities for the country's youth, as well as move people away from the Nile Valley to ease the stress on existing infrastructure and reduce congestion.

History
The city was named for the commencement of the Yom Kippur War otherwise called the October War, it started on 10 Ramadan, 1393 AH according to the Islamic Calendar. It shares its namesake with the Sixth of October City nearby.

Location

Economy

Agriculture
47 million Egyptian pounds have been invested in afforestation in the city.

Industry
Some of the industries present in the city include electronics, food processing, ready-made garments, plastic, paper, textiles, building materials, steel, pharmaceuticals and furniture. There are many industrial zones in the city.

Industrial zones

Labor force
The population of the city is approximately 500,000 people

Infrastructure
The city's infrastructure includes water supply, sewers, an electrical grid and telecommunications.

Water supply
The city has been connected with two water purification plants with capacity of 621,000 m^3/day and station wells with capacity of 20,000 m^3/day.

Climate
Köppen-Geiger climate classification system classifies its climate as hot desert (BWh) as the rest of Egypt.

See also
 Obour
 6th of October (city)
 List of cities and towns in Egypt

References

Cities in Egypt
Populated places in Sharqia Governorate
New towns started in the 1970s
New towns in Egypt